Aliabad (also Romanized as ‘Alīābād; also known as Hemmatābād) is a village in Rabatat Rural District, Kharanaq District, Ardakan County, Yazd Province, Iran. At the 2006 census, its population was 10, in 5 families.

References 

Populated places in Ardakan County